Intocable was selected as the track from Don Omar's debut album, The Last Don released on July 25, 2005 along with "Dile".  The song didn't receive much promotion but was notably accepted by fans and radio stations, and charted at number 38 on the Billboard Tropical Songs, the song doesn't have a music video. The song is said to have been written for Puerto Rican drug lord Angel Ayala Vazquez also known as "Buster" or "Angelo Millones", who paid for much of the production of the album.

Track listings
iTunes Digital download
 "Dile" — 3:25
 "Intocable" — 2:46

Charts

References

External links
 iDon.com
 Don Omar Official Site

2004 singles
Spanish-language songs
Don Omar songs
Song recordings produced by Luny Tunes
2003 songs
Machete Music singles
Songs written by Don Omar